GET 27 (/dʒɛt/)  is a liquor with mint used as an apéritif or in cocktails. The company was founded by Jean and Pierre Get in 1796.  Production was in Revel, in the Lauragais.  Trademarked in 1868 as Pippermint GET, the liqueur used peppermint oil imported from England rather than the locally-grown variety.  The distillery remains in use, as the town’s cultural centre, but production moved to Gémenos and then to Beaucaire in 1995.  The company is now part of Casanis, owned by Bacardi. While its name refers to its original alcohol percentage, it currently has an alcohol content of 21%. Another product of the brand is the GET 31.

References 

French liqueurs
Bacardi